Seliberia stellata is an oligotrophic bacterium from the genus of Seliberia with a flagellum which was isolated from humus-illuvial pozol soil from Karelian Isthmus in Russia.

References

Further reading
 
 
 

Hyphomicrobiales
Bacteria described in 1963